Heather Hattin (born 15 May 1961) is a Canadian former rower. She competed in the women's single sculls event at the 1988 Summer Olympics.

References

External links
 

1961 births
Living people
Canadian female rowers
Olympic rowers of Canada
Rowers at the 1988 Summer Olympics
Sportspeople from Windsor, Ontario
Commonwealth Games medallists in rowing
Commonwealth Games bronze medallists for Canada
Rowers at the 1986 Commonwealth Games
Pan American Games medalists in rowing
Pan American Games silver medalists for Canada
Rowers at the 1983 Pan American Games
World Rowing Championships medalists for Canada
20th-century Canadian women
Medallists at the 1986 Commonwealth Games